Swamp darner may refer to:

 Austroaeschna parvistigma, a species of dragonfly native to Australia
 Epiaeschna heros, a species of dragonfly, found in North America

Animal common name disambiguation pages